The Area Festival was a music festival founded by popular electronic musician Moby, who asserted that he was "in large part, inspired by the ethos of Lollapalooza", and wished to create a similarly "genuinely eclectic, interesting, alternative music festival". Moby organized the first such festival, called Area:One in 2001, and the sequel tour Area2, in 2002. The festival is currently on indefinite hiatus. The festival featured diverse genres of music. Besides headliner Moby, the main stage mostly featured rock and pop acts. The second stage was an air-conditioned tent where electronic, dance and smaller bands performed.

Acts
The 2001 Area:One acts included Moby, OutKast, The New Deal, Carl Cox, Nelly Furtado, Incubus, Paul Oakenfold, The Roots, The Orb, New Order, and Rinôçérôse.

The 2002 Area2 acts included Moby and David Bowie in alternating headlining slots: as well as Ash, Blue Man Group, and Busta Rhymes.

The festival also featured a DJ tent with a rotating list of artists.

The main sponsors for the tour were Intel, KMX, and Pepsi.

Area:One
This concert in 2001 featured:
 Moby
 Jurassic 5
 Outkast
 Kelis
 New Order
 Gwen Stefani
 Nelly Furtado
 Incubus
 The Roots
 Paul Oakenfold
 The Orb
 Carl Cox
 Rinôçérôse
 Timo Maas
 Kevin Saunderson
 Derrick May
 Juan Atkins

Area:One Tour Dates

Area:One was a three-and-a-half-week touring festival in the Summer of 2001.

Area2
This concert in 2002 featured:

Main Stage
 Moby
 David Bowie
 Billy Talent in Toronto 
 Busta Rhymes Rhymes never played in Toronto - he was held up in immigration on the way in.  
 Blue Man Group
 Ash

Stage Two:
 Carl Cox
 John Digweed
 Tiësto
 DJ Dan
 The Avalanches
 Dieselboy
 DJ Tim Skinner

Area2 Tour Dates
Area was a three-week touring festival in the mid-2002.

See also

 List of electronic music festivals

References

External links
 Area2 Announcement from Moby
 Area festival find more...
 Area2 Photos and Writeup from ConcertWire
 Moby Says Area Festival Probably Won't Return In 2003
 Moby Taps Busta, Bowie, More For Area2
 Bowie, Moby are Stars in Area2; Festival offers multiple musical flavors
 Bowie Graciously Steals Host's Thunder; Area2 with David Bowie, Moby and others
 Area Music Festival Returns This Summer; Area2 Lineup Includes David Bowie, Moby, Busta Rhymes, Carl Cox, John Digweed, More Acts to Be Announced

Rock festivals in the United States
2001 concert tours
2002 concert tours
Moby
Electronic music festivals in the United States
Music festivals established in 2001
Pop music festivals in the United States